Renié Conley (July 31, 1901 − June 12, 1992) was a prominent Hollywood costume designer.

Biography
Born in Republic, Washington and studied at Chouinard Art Institute and University of California in Los Angeles.
For over three decades, Renié was noted for clothing the stars in subtle, elegant outfits, as can be seen in the eponymous costumes Ginger Rogers wore as the glamorous all-American working girl in Kitty Foyle (1940). She got her start designing theatre sets and then working as a sketch artist for Paramount Pictures. In 1937, she became a costume designer for RKO Pictures. She remained with the studio, attiring its biggest stars until the 1950s when she started freelancing. In addition to films, Renié's work can also be seen on such television series as Haywire (1990 - 1991). In 1963, Renié's costumes for the epic Cleopatra earned her an Oscar (she received four other nominations). For a while, she also designed costumes for 'Shipstead & Johnson's Ice Follies'.

She also designed the costumes for the 1942 film A Date with the Falcon and the 1943 The Falcon and the Co-eds.

Conley was an adherent of the Church of Christ, Scientist who contended that her faith enabled her to overcome worldly ambition, putting her work on an unselfish and solid foundation.

She died at the age of 91 years in Los Angeles County, California.

References

External links 

Renie costume design drawings, Margaret Herrick Library, Academy of Motion Picture Arts and Sciences

American costume designers
Best Costume Design Academy Award winners
1901 births
1992 deaths